Jananayak Chandrashekhar University (JNCU), is a state university established in 2016 by Government of Uttar Pradesh in Ballia, Uttar Pradesh with 122 affiliated colleges.  These 122 colleges of Ballia district were formerly affiliated to Mahatma Gandhi Kashi Vidyapith, Varanasi. For academic year 2016-17 exams were conducted by Mahatma Gandhi Kashi Vidyapith, Varanasi but students were awarded a degree of Jananayak Chandrashekhar University.

Affiliated Colleges

Government Colleges 

 Shaheed Mangal Pandey Rajkiya Mahila Mahavidyalaya, Nagwa, Ballia

Government Aided Colleges 

Satish Chandra College, Ballia
 Shri Murli Manohar Town Post Graduate College, Ballia
 Kunwar Singh Post Graduate College, Ballia
 Gulab Devi Mahila Post Graduate College, Ballia
 Kamala Devi Bajoria Degree College, Dubhar, Ballia
 Shri Bajrang Post Graduate College, Dadar Ashram, Sikandarpur, Ballia
 Mathura Post Graduate College, Rasra, Ballia
 Amar Nath Mishra Post Graduate College, Dubey Chhapra, Ballia
 Sri Sudristi Baba Post Graduate College, Sudistpuri Raniganj, Ballia
 Devendra Post Graduate college, Belthra Road, Ballia

Self-financed Colleges 
Gauri Bhaiya Mahavidiyalay, Sagarpali
 Jagdish Singh Mahavidyalaya, Dehari, Rasra, Ballia
Shri Narheji Mahavidyalaya, Narhi, Rasara, Ballia
 Kisan Post Graduate College, Raksa, Ratsar, Ballia
 Swami Ramnarayanacharya Mahila Mahavidyalaya, Belthara Road, Ballia
 Radha Mohan Kisan Majdoor Mahavidyalaya ,Niyamatpur, Kanso, Ballia
 Yashoda Nandan Mahila Mahavidyalaya, Gaura, Madanpura, Ekail, Ballia
Ramdhari Chandrabhan PG College, Nafrepur (Nagpura) Rasra, Ballia
 Veer Lorik Sughar Mahavidyalaya, Vigah Charauwa, Ballia
 Shri Jamuna Ram Degree College, Chitbaragaon, Ballia 
 Shaktipith Mahavidyalaya, Daulatpur, Ballia
 Duja Devi Degree College, Rajauli, Sahatwar, Ballia
 Udit Narayan Rishabh Mahavidyalaya, Pindari, Ballia
 Maa Kasturi Devi Mahavidyalaya Nawanagar, Ballia 
 Snatkottar Mahavidyalaya, Bansdih, Ballia
 Shri Ram Karan Post Graduate College, BHIMPURA NO.1, Ballia
 Gauri Shankar Rai Girls Post Graduate College, Gaurishankar Puram (Karnai), Ballia
 Sri Rakhant Baba Mahavidyalaya, Atrauli, Karmauta, Ballia
 Sri Narheji Law College, Narhi, Rasara, Ballia
 Sri Shiv Narayan Ganga Prasad Mahila Mahavidyalaya, Khanpur, Dumaria, Ballia
 Vivekanand Mahavidyalaya, Semari, Ballia
 Smt. Fulehra Smarak Mahila Mahavidyalaya, Kamtailla, Rasara, Ballia
 DS MAA MALTI DEVI PG COLLEGE,BAGURI,BALLIA

See also
Mahatma Gandhi Kashi Vidyapith
Allahabad State University
Siddharth University

References

External links
 

Universities in Uttar Pradesh
Ballia
Educational institutions established in 2016
2016 establishments in Uttar Pradesh